Norape glabra is a moth of the family Megalopygidae. It was described by Walter Hopp in 1927. It is found in Argentina.

References

Moths described in 1927
Megalopygidae